In enzymology, a nucleoplasmin ATPase is an enzyme that catalyzes the chemical reaction

ATP + H2O  ADP + phosphate

Thus, the two substrates of this enzyme are ATP and H2O, whereas its two products are ADP and phosphate.

This enzyme belongs to the family of hydrolases, specifically those acting on acid anhydrides to facilitate cellular and subcellular movement.  The systematic name of this enzyme class is ATP phosphohydrolase (nucleosome-assembling).

References

 
 
 

EC 3.6.4
Enzymes of unknown structure